Asperdaphne desalesii is a species of sea snail, a marine gastropod mollusk in the family Raphitomidae.

Description
The length of the shell varies between 5 mm and 8 mm.

(Original description) The small, solid, turreted shell is elongately fusiform. It is whitish, pale yellow. It is irregularly zoned, with white and fulvous.  It contains 7 whorls, including the protoconch. These are convex, elegantly thickly obliquely ribbed, and thickly spirally lirate. The body whorl contains 14 rounded, subelevate ribs. The lirae are small, distant, subelevate, regular, passing over the ribs The apex of two whorls is smooth and elongate. The suture is deep. The ovate aperture measures ⅓ the length of shell. The outer lip is thickened and conspicuously dentate within. The sinus is broad, conspicuous, posterior. The siphonal canal is somewhat long. The columella is inconspicuous, a more intense fulvous behind, and thickly obliquely lirate.

Distribution
This marine species is endemic to Australia and occurs off South Australia, Tasmania and Victoria.

References

 Hedley, C. 1901. Some new or unfigured Australian shells. Records of the Australian Museum 4: 22–27
 Verco, J.C. 1909. Notes on South Australian marine Mollusca with descriptions of new species. Part XII. Transactions of the Royal Society of South Australia 33: 293–342
 May, W.L. 1921. A Checklist of the Mollusca of Tasmania
 May, W.L. 1923. An illustrated index of Tasmanian shells: with 47 plates and 1052 species
 Powell, A.W.B. 1966. The molluscan families Speightiidae and Turridae, an evaluation of the valid taxa, both Recent and fossil, with list of characteristic species. Bulletin of the Auckland Institute and Museum. Auckland, New Zealand 5: 1–184, pls 1–23 . Hobart : Government Printer 100 pp.. Hobart, Tasmania : Government Printer 114 pp.

External links
 Pritchard G.B. & Gatliff J.H. (1899). On some new species of Victorian Mollusca. Proceedings of the Royal Society of Victoria. new ser., 12: 100–107, pl. 8
 
 Gastropods.com: Asperdaphne (Asperdaphne) desalesii
 
 Hedley C. (1922). A revision of the Australian Turridae. Records of the Australian Museum. 13(6): 213–359

desalesii
Gastropods described in 1877
Gastropods of Australia